Fraser Bullock (born 1955) is an American entrepreneur who is a partner of Sorenson Capital and former COO of the Salt Lake Organizing Committee (SLOC) of the 2002 Winter Olympics. He is the current president and CEO of the Salt Lake City-Utah Committee for the Games, bidding for the 2030 Winter Olympics. Prior to joining the SLOC, Bullock had run his own private equity firm.

He graduated from Brigham Young University with a bachelor's degree in 1978 and an MBA in 1980. Since 2002, Bullock has served on the board of directors of the Utah Athletic Foundation, the non-profit that manages the Utah Olympic Park in Park City, Utah, the Utah Olympic Oval in Salt Lake City, and the Soldier Hollow Nordic venue in Midway, Utah.

Bullock was among the founding members of Bain Capital and also worked at Bain & Company.

Bullock has served in multiple positions in the Church of Jesus Christ of Latter-day Saints (LDS Church) including as an area seventy.

During the 2012 U.S. presidential election, he appeared in a Restore Our Future television ad supporting Republican Mitt Romney and touting Romney's experience as head of the 2002 Winter Olympics.

References 

American sports businesspeople
Brigham Young University alumni
Canadian leaders of the Church of Jesus Christ of Latter-day Saints
1955 births
American leaders of the Church of Jesus Christ of Latter-day Saints
Canadian emigrants to the United States
Area seventies (LDS Church)
People from Alpine, Utah
People from Taber, Alberta
Businesspeople from Alberta
Businesspeople from Utah
Living people
Bain Capital people
American financial company founders
Bain & Company employees
Utah Republicans
American chief operating officers
Recipients of the Paralympic Order
Latter Day Saints from Utah